Vanishing bile duct syndrome is a loose collection of diseases which leads to the injury to hepatic bile ducts and eventual ductopenia.

Signs and symptoms
The presentation is dependent upon the underlying cause.  The course can be rapid or chronic.

 Fatigue
 Anorexia
 Abdominal pain
 Weight loss
 Pruritus
 Hyperlipidemia
 Malabsorption
 Fat-soluble vitamin deficiencies
 Elevated alkaline phosphatase
 Elevated gamma-glutamyltransferase
 Elevated conjugated bilirubin

Cause

Congenital
In fetal and neonatal life the ductal plates are remodeled.  The malformations can be atretic or fibrocystic.

Atretic causes
 Intrahepatic bile duct atresia (Alagille syndrome) (ALGS2 MIM:610205 and ALGS1 MIM:118450)
 Extrahepatic bile duct atresia

Fibrocystic causes
 Autosomal recessive polycystic kidney disease
 Congential hepatic fibrosis
 Caroli's disease
 Von Meyenburg complex

Chromosomal associations
 Trisomy 17, 18 and 21

Genetic associations
 Cystic fibrosis
 Alpha 1 antitrypsin deficiency
 Trihydroxycoprostanic acidemia
 Byler's disease

Immunologic associations
Bile duct injury and loss can result from autoimmune destruction.  T cells recognize biliary epithelial cell antigens causing injury and eventual atresia.

Other causes
 Primary biliary cirrhosis
 Primary sclerosing cholangitis
 Hodgkin's lymphoma
 Chronic graft-versus-host disease
 Drugs(chlorpromazine)/Toxins
 Ischemia

Diagnosis

Treatment
Treatment is dependent upon the underlying cause. Treatment is supportive as it is not possible to induce regrowth of lost ducts.

Medical therapies
 Ursodeoxycholic acid
 Immunosuppression
 General consensus is that more studies are needed before this can be considered
 Organ transplant

References

External links
 Uptodate:Hepatic ductopenia and vanishing bile duct syndrome

Hepatology
Syndromes